Arielle may refer to:
 Arielle (given name), list of people with the name
 MS Arielle, a cruise ship now under the name MV Ocean Star Pacific

See also
 Ariel (disambiguation)